"I'm All Yours" is an R&B-hip-hop song by British artist Jay Sean. The song was released in North America as the first single from his second album there, Neon. In other markets, including the UK, the song serves as Jay Sean's lead single from his fourth studio album. The single features American rapper Pitbull and is produced by Orange Factory Music.

"I'm All Yours" had its radio premiere on 18 April 2012. The track was officially released to US radio on 22 May 2012 and digital retailers on 29 May 2012.

Background
In February 2012, Jay Sean revealed at the Cash Money’s pre-Grammy party in Hollywood that a brand new single, I'm All Yours featuring Pitbull, is coming. He told Rap-Up, "It’s gonna be a smash and I’m saying it right now because the video is insane". He further added "We shot it in Miami—yachts, helicopters, speed boats, all of that good stuff".

Speaking in May 2012 to MTV News Jocelyn Vena, Jay explained the background to the track, "Well, you know, people who know my music, especially when I first came over to America, one of the first things that people noticed with my songs is I like to do feel-good songs. And when it comes to the singles, that's what I like to give them. And 'I'm All Yours' is really the epitome of all that". He further added, "So it's still got that element of romance, which is what I like to bring to music. So it's high-energy and romantic. And the Pitbull collaboration actually happened in Australia, where we were on tour together, and you know, we're all fans of each other. We got talking, like, 'Man, we should do something.' So we laid it out right there and then". Further he said "I think the thing is, you got someone like Pit and myself, we share similar fanbases, but also, as I said, it's that high-energy music that really blends well together," he said. "And I think sometimes certain voices and certain vibes and certain styles just work together on a record, so it was just nice the way it came out"

Leak
The song along with the artwork was leaked on 20 April, but it was soon taken down by IFPI. However, Jay uploaded the artwork on his Facebook account later that day.

Composition

"I'm All Yours" is a Dance-pop influenced track that lasts for three minutes and thirty eight seconds. It includes the elements of club beats. The song starts with Jay Sean singing "I'm all yours tonight, got a feeling that I can't deny, everything about you gets me high, girl I want this for the rest of my life, I'm all yours".  When this ends, Pitbull starts his rap. The song continues with Jay Sean singing "I'm all yours tonight, got a feeling that I can't deny, everything about you gets me high, girl I want this for the rest of my life, I'm all yours". When this ends, Pitbull starts his rap again. The song continues with Jay Sean singing "I'm all yours tonight, got a feeling that I can't deny, everything about you gets me high, girl I want this for the rest of my life, I'm all yours". When this ends, Pitbull starts his rap again. The song finishes with Jay Sean singing "I'm all yours tonight, got a feeling that I can't deny, everything about you gets me high, girl I want this for the rest of my life, I'm all yours".

Music video
The music video for "I'm All Yours" was shot with Pitbull in Miami in February 2012 as a high budget video. Jay Sean tweeted about the video shoot and gave a sneak peek photograph as well. The video features Colombian model Nawal Ayoub, five exotic cars (worth almost a half a million dollars each), a yacht party and cameo from American rapper and co-founder of Cash Money Records, Birdman. The video was directed by Gil Green, who had previously directed the video for Jay Sean's 2009 hit single, "Do You Remember".

The video was premiered on 21 May 2012, during BET's 106 & Park, and had its online premiere on Vevo two days later.

Promotion
Jay Sean gave numerous Stage performances in Countries like US, Lebanon, Indonesia, Japan etc. for the promotion of the song and the album. He even appeared on The Tonight Show with Jay Leno telecasted on 24 July 2012 and performed the solo version of the track.

Later Jay Sean announced "I'm All Yours Tour" for Australia and New Zealand. The Tour included 6 shows in Australia and 1 show in New Zealand.

Confirmed track listing
Digital download
 "I'm All Yours" (featuring Pitbull) – 3:38

Credits and personnel
Lead vocals – Jay Sean, Pitbull
Producers – OFM
Lyrics – Jay Sean, Hookman Marlin Bonds, Atozzio Towns, Ryan Taylor, Armando Perez
Label: Cash Money Records, Universal Republic

Charts and certifications

Weekly charts

Year-end charts

Certifications

Release history

References

2012 singles
Jay Sean songs
Pitbull (rapper) songs
Songs written by Jay Sean
Songs written by Pitbull (rapper)
Cash Money Records singles
Music videos directed by Gil Green
2012 songs